Macacine gammaherpesvirus 4 (McHV-4), commonly known as rhesus lymphocryptovirus (RLV), is a species of virus in the genus Lymphocryptovirus, subfamily Gammaherpesvirinae, family Herpesviridae, and order Herpesvirales.

In nature, Macacine gammaherpesvirus 4 infects rhesus macaques (Macaca mulatta).

Comparison with Human gammaherpesvirus 4
Its genetic structure has been fully sequenced and found to be highly homologous with that of Human gammaherpesvirus 4, commonly known as Epstein-Barr virus, at 65%. The structural proteins are highly conserved, while genes expressed during Human gammaherpesvirus 4 latent infection are much less well conserved. Even in cases where genes have low homology, the Macacine gammaherpesvirus 4 infection genes are functionally interchangeable with Human gammaherpesvirus 4 genes.

Macacine gammaherpesvirus 4 infection in rhesus monkeys resembles Human gammaherpesvirus 4 infection in humans in several respects:

 Oral transmission,
 Atypical lymphocytosis
 Lymphadenopathy
 Activation of CD23+ peripheral blood B cells
 Sustained serologic responses to lytic and latent Human gammaherpesvirus 4 antigens
 Latent infection in the peripheral blood
 Virus persistence in oropharyngeal secretions

These features make the rhesus lymphocryptovirus potentially useful for  studying the pathogenesis, prevention, and treatment of Human gammaherpesvirus 4 infection and associated oncogenesis.

References

Gammaherpesvirinae